Aluchehluy-e Sofla (also Romanized as Ālūchehlūy-e Soflá; also known as Ālūchehlū-ye Soflá) is a village in Ahmadabad Rural District, Takht-e Soleyman District, Takab County, West Azerbaijan Province, Iran. At the 2006 census, its population was 487, in 94 families.

References 

Populated places in Takab County